Get a Grip is the eleventh studio album by American rock band Aerosmith, released in April 1993 by Geffen Records. Get a Grip was the band's last studio album to be released by Geffen before they returned to Columbia Records.

Get a Grip featured guests including Don Henley, who sang backup on "Amazing", and Lenny Kravitz, who offered backup vocals and collaboration to "Line Up". As on Permanent Vacation and Pump, this album featured numerous song collaborators from outside the band including: Desmond Child, Jim Vallance, Mark Hudson, Richie Supa, Taylor Rhodes, Jack Blades, and Tommy Shaw.

Get a Grip became Aerosmith's best-selling studio album worldwide, achieving sales of over 20 million copies. The album became the band's first album to reach number one in the United States and tied with Pump for their second best-selling album in the U.S., selling over 7 million copies as of 1995 (Toys in the Attic leads with nine million). This also made it their third consecutive album with U.S. sales of at least five million. Two songs from the album won Grammy Awards for Best Rock Performance by a Duo or Group with Vocal, in 1993 and 1994. The album was voted Album of the Year by Metal Edge readers in the magazine's 1993 Readers' Choice Awards, while "Livin' on the Edge" was voted Best Video.

Production
The album originally had 12 songs and was scheduled to be released in the third quarter of 1992, but Geffen A&R executive John Kalodner listened to what had been recorded and thought it lacked variety and a radio-friendly song. So the band went back to write more songs with collaborators such as Child.

Regarding songs that reflect on the band's history with drug abuse such as "Get a Grip" and "Amazing", Steven Tyler declared: "We were saying you can point it back to some of those old beliefs about the crossroads and signing up with the devil, that you can look at the drugs as that: It can be fun in the beginning but then it comes time to pay your debt, and if you're not sharp enough to see that it's taking you down, then it really will get you."

Many songs were written and recorded for the album that were either used as B-sides or never released. "Don't Stop" and "Head First" were released as B-sides, as well as "Can't Stop Messin'", which also appears on several special editions of the album as an addition in the track list. Alternate versions of other songs recorded during the sessions including "Deuces Are Wild", "Lizard Love", "Devil's Got a New Disguise", and "Legendary Child" have since been released on various albums and soundtracks.

Other songs were listed on the official Aerosmith website in the late 1990s. "Black Cherry", "Dime Store Lover", "Meltdown", "Rocket 88", "Wham Bam", and "Yo Momma" were listed on the lyrics page of the website. In 2005, Kalodner confirmed the existence of several of these songs, as well as "Trouble", "Strange", "13", and "Keep on Movin'". "Deuces Are Wild" was possibly recorded again during these sessions. Several songs are also listed on copyright repertoires, including "Ain't Gonna Break My Heart", "Good Thang", and "Jake". These songs can be traced to the year 1991.

Cover art
Get a Grip's cover art, depicting an image of a cow with a captive bead nipple ring through its udder and a brand of the Aerosmith logo, was designed by noted album-cover artist Hugh Syme. Music critic Steven Hyden has referred to the album's cover art as "the worst album cover ever", expressing surprise that Syme was responsible for it given his other work. An animal-rights group objected to the cover art, but the band confirmed the image had been digitally altered and did not depict an actual act of animal cruelty.

A special edition of the album was released in a fabric-covered case made to resemble cowhide.

First digital download
On June 27, 1994, Aerosmith became the first major artist to release a song as an exclusive digital download, making "Head First" available as a 4-megabyte WAV file to CompuServe subscribers. Around 10,000 users downloaded the song in the first few days, even though at the time, most users accessed the service with a modem, meaning the download would have taken the better part of an hour.
"Head First" was earlier used as the B-side for "Eat the Rich".

Critical reception

Reviewing for Rolling Stone in 1993, Mark Coleman said he enjoyed the title song and compared the introductory track to the band's 1986 rendition of "Walk This Way" with Run–D.M.C. However, he found much of the rest unadventurous and too "somber", negatively comparing "Livin' on the Edge" to a Bon Jovi song, and lamenting the outside contributions from songwriters and collaborators. Ultimately, Coleman determined that, "for a spirited half-hour or so, Aerosmith pretty much gets over on sheer awe-inspiring technique". Robert Christgau was more positive in a contemporaneous review for Playboy, saying that while it "occasionally exploits their rap connection", remains faithful to Aerosmith's template of "fast ones and slow ones; lyrically it's fuck me and fuck you", but with such superpro crunch and commitment that no good-timing headbanger will give a shit. Christgau highlighted "Cryin'" as "the classic" on the album, while saying that "the closest thing to a duff cut [is] the 'meaningful' Livin' on the Edge, which could be a hit anyway." He later ranked it 64th on his "Dean's List" accompanying The Village Voices annual Pazz & Jop critics poll of the year's best albums, and assigned it an A-minus in his 2000 book Christgau's Consumer Guide: Albums of the '90s.

Track listing

Immediately after "Amazing," a snippet of "Who Threw the Whiskey in the Well", by Lucky Millinder, is heard as if being tuned in on an old radio. Tyler says, "So from all of us at Aerosmith to all of you out there, wherever you are, remember: the light at the end of the tunnel may be you. Good night." The music then fades out.

Personnel
Aerosmith
Steven Tyler – lead vocals, keyboards, mandolin, harmonica, additional percussion, arranger
Joe Perry – guitar, backing vocals, lead vocals on "Walk On Down"
Brad Whitford – guitar, lead guitar on “Fever”, “Gotta Love It”, and “Flesh”
Tom Hamilton – bass guitar, bass solo on “Gotta Love It”
Joey Kramer – drums

Additional personnel
Paul Barontrumpet
Desmond Child – keyboards on "Crazy"
David Campbell – orchestra arrangements on "Crazy" and "Amazing"
Bruce Fairbairn – trumpet, production
Don Henley – background vocals on "Amazing"
Sandy Kanaeholo – log drums on "Eat the Rich"
Tom Keenlyside – saxophone
Lenny Kravitz – background vocals on "Line Up"
Melvin Liufau – log drums on "Eat the Rich"
Wesey Mamea – log drums on "Eat the Rich"
Ian Putzbaritone saxophone
Bob Rogerstrombone
Richard Supa – keyboards on "Amazing"
Liainaiala Tagaloa – log drums on "Eat the Rich"
Mapuhi T. Tekurio – log drums on "Eat the Rich"
Aladd Alationa Teofilo – log drums on "Eat the Rich"
John Webster – keyboards

Production
EngineersJohn Aguto, Ed Korengo, Ken Lomas, Mike Plotnikoff, David Thoener, Karl Heilbron
Pre Production EngineerTony Lentini
MixingBrendan O'Brien
MasteringGreg Fulginiti at Masterdisk
Mastering SupervisorDavid Donnelly
ProgrammingJohn Webster
Production coordinationDebra Shallman
Guitar technicianDan Murphy
Art directionMichael Golob
Cover designHugh Syme
PhotographyEdward Colver, William Hames
John Kalodner

Charts

Weekly charts

Year-end charts

Certifications and sales

Awards
Grammy Awards

Metal Edge Readers' Choice Awards

See also 
Get a Grip Tour

References

Bibliography
 

1993 albums
Aerosmith albums
Geffen Records albums
Albums produced by Bruce Fairbairn
Albums recorded at A&M Studios
Albums recorded at Little Mountain Sound Studios